The Qatar motorcycle Grand Prix is a motorcycling event that is part of the FIM Grand Prix motorcycle racing season.

The Losail race track in Qatar represents the debut race of each MotoGP season. In 2008, the track held the first night event in MotoGP history. The 2008 night event, aside from drawing boosted viewing which also coincided with the race being moved to the opening spot on the calendar, was initiated with the intent of increasing equipment performance: the day-time heat in Qatar has been hazardous to the conditions of tires and expensive, customized parts on the multimillion-dollar motorcycles. Rider safety notwithstanding, the extreme heat could be a critical variable contributing to defeat. Qatar's Grand Prix is the only event in the entire MotoGP calendar to be held at night.

The 2020 MotoGP race was scheduled to open the season before being cancelled due to the outbreak of Coronavirus. The Moto2 and Moto3 classes proceeded as planned.

The event is due to take place at the Losail International Circuit until at least 2031.

Official names and sponsors
2004–2005: Marlboro Grand Prix of Qatar
2006–2016: Commercial Bank Grand Prix of Qatar
2017–2018, 2022: Grand Prix of Qatar (no official sponsor)
2019: VisitQatar Grand Prix
2020: QNB Grand Prix of Qatar
2021: Barwa Grand Prix of Qatar

Criticism 
The race has been argued to be an example of sportswashing.

Winners

Multiple winners (riders)

Multiple winners (manufacturers)

By year

References

 
Motorsport competitions in Qatar
Motorcycle racing in Qatar
Recurring sporting events established in 2004
2004 establishments in Qatar
Motorcycle racing controversies